Buckinghamshire, England is most notable for its open countryside and natural features, including the Chiltern Hills Area of Outstanding Natural Beauty and the River Thames.  The county is also home to many historic houses, some of which are open to the public through the National Trust, such as Waddesdon Manor, West Wycombe Park and Cliveden; and others which still act as private houses such as the Prime Minister's country retreat Chequers.

Buckinghamshire is also the home of various notable people from history in whose honour tourist attractions have been established.  The most notable of these is the author Roald Dahl who included many local features and characters in his works.

There are various notable sports facilities in Buckinghamshire such as Adams Park, and the county is also home to the world-famous Pinewood Studios.  

This is a list of places of interest in the county. See List of places in Buckinghamshire for a list of settlements.

Places of interest

References 

 
Buckinghamshire